Terxo AG Switzerland  is a Swiss plastics processing company based in Wetzikon.

History
Location:

The factory and warehouse buildings as well as the residential block were commissioned by a window and door builder. It set up their production there. After this company went bankrupt, the property was taken over by a tobacco company. This then produced cigarettes until the production was closed due to falling demand. Terxo was then set up in these premises. A portion of the production space has been sub-leased to an adhesive company, which is also a direct customer of bottles and closures that Terxo manufactures. A development department of the locking system manufacturer Kaba Group is accommodated in the premises.

Company

Werner Dubach founded the company Createch AG in Nürensdorf, which manufactures various bottles and closures for the medical, cosmetics and food sector in the injection-blow, injection-blown and injection-molding process. It was planned to build a company building consisting of several parts, with office, production and storage facilities. On the one hand, granting problems, which led to massive changes in the construction project, led to financial problems. In addition, copyright complaints were filed for the production of food-grade food packaging for Danone yoghurts and quarks by the toy manufacturer Lego. This led to the bankruptcy of the company Createch. The main building was not completely finished and a part is still in the shell and is used as a warehouse. The Createch was passed on by the Credit Suisse until the Dutch Medisize Group took over the company. The Createch was then renamed to Medisize AG Switzerland. In the meantime Werner Dubach had founded Terxo with some former Createch employees and the financial commitment of Markus Schellenberg in Wetzikon.
Werner Dubach had designed and patented some closures. These are partly still produced today by the Medisize Schweiz AG, the Terxo and the German Terxo partner company Bericap. Werner Dubach retired a few years ago, the company Terxo is now under the leadership of Markus J. Schellenberg.

Products
Terxo manufactures, in particular, closures for food packaging by means of injection molding machines and injection blow-molding machines as well as assembly machines for further processing, but also parts for medical technology as well as for adhesives, bottles for adhesives and bottles for milk drinks. The Terxocut screw caps for Tetra Pak's are also co-produced by the German partner company and shareholder (30% of Terxo shares) Bericap under license worldwide.

The Actifit bottles (Polyethylene) for the Emmi AG milk processor, which Terxo manufactures, is a major competitive pressure. This is because the company Medisize manufactures these bottles also for Emmi. In addition, the injection molding and injection blow molding tool manufacturer Ganahl, who has produced the corresponding tools for Terxo and Medisize, is also producing such bottles. This means that there are three companies in the canton of Zurich, which all supply the same customer with the same product.

Facts
Legal form: stock company/Aktiengesellschaft
Founded: 1997
Headquarters: Wetzikon, Switzerland
Head: Markus J. Schellenberg (CEOW)
Employees: 30
Sales: CHF 13-15 million.
Plastic industry and Packaging and labeling, food and adhesive packaging

References
 
Homepage der Ganahl
Medisize Schweiz

1997 establishments in Switzerland
Plastics companies of Switzerland